Higher education in Ethiopia is the lowest in quality of standard relevance and academic freedom, despite an expansion of private higher education and rising enrollment. Higher education supposed originated by Saint Yared music school in the sixth century in line with centuries old traditional education of the Ethiopian Orthodox Tewahedo Church. Modern higher education was commenced during the reign of Emperor Haile Selassie with the establishment of the University College of Addis Ababa, now called Addis Ababa University in 1950. It then followed by Haramaya University. By the time, there were only three secondary schools in the country, used as preparatory for college entrance.

The earlier educational  system of imperial regime was based on European style facilities implemented: Arts, Sciences and Education, includes thirteen departments, seven in Arts (Humanities, Social and Political Science, Geography, English, Economics, Public Administration and Commence), and six in Science (Chemistry, Physics, Mathematics, Geography, Biology and Pharmacy). Graduate level was introduced by 1979 followed by Alemaya University in 1984 and numerous public universities ensued.

Reforms on higher education were made since the regime of EPRDF in 1994. As of 2022, there are 83 universities, 42 public universities, and more than 35 higher education institutions. Foreign students constitute 16,305 in higher education level.

History

Higher education in Ethiopia traced back to the origin of the Ethiopian Orthodox Tewahedo Church, based on monastic institutions. In the sixth century, Saint Yared formed his music school that trained qualified priests in the religious music and dance characterized their faith. This system evolved throughout millennia until the mid-20th century modernization of Emperor Haile Selassie. In July 1950, Haile Selassie pledged Jesuit Canadian teachers for establishment of college in the country. The University College of Addis Ababa, now called the Addis Ababa University (AAU) then formed in the year. As a college, the institution intended to prepare students for "further overseas study or vocational certificate education". By foreign investment fund, six specialized technical colleges had been established since 1970s by the imperial government. The first university outside AAU is Haramaya University, founded in 1953. By the time, there were only three secondary schools in the country, used for preparatory to college entrance. European-styled education system implemented with separated facilities of Arts, Sciences, and Education, includes thirteen departments: seven in Arts (Humanities, Social and Political Science, Geography, English, Economics, Public Administration and Commence), and six in Science (Chemistry, Physics, Mathematics, Geology, Biology and Pharmacy). 

Graduate level training began in Addis Ababa University in 1979, followed by Alemaya University in 1984. Later Wondo Genet College of Forestry trained undergraduate through forestry programs. Jimma, Hawassa and Mekelle University later continued the training process to graduate students. After the abolishing of imperial government in 1974, the military regime under the Derg expanded the higher education system based on communist Marxist-Leninist framework, having strong security surveillance, repression of dissents, and prohibition of student organizations. After the fall of the Derg in 1991, the new EPRDF led government undertook market reform in the higher educational system. Nevertheless, by the end of 20th-century, the higher education system was based on highly regimented management, conservative intellectual orientation, limited autonomy and few academic staff with doctorates, declining the educational quality and weak research output and poor connection with global higher education.

Between 1996 and 2003, annual graduate students intake grew about 9,000 to over 18,000 by the Ministry of Education sponsored institution. The enrollment of graduate programs has increased from 200 to 2,000.

Reform agenda
The Ethiopian education currently focused on reforms in three levels: the overall system, the institutions, and the academic programs. The reforms began in 1960s, repressed in 1970s and reinstated in 1994. As of 2022, there are 83 private universities, and 42 public universities, and more than 35 institution of higher learning. There are 16,305 students enrolled in the whole higher education.

List of facilities

Universities
 Addis Ababa University
 Adigrat University
 Haramaya University
 Bahir Dar University
 Jimma University
 Mekelle University
 Jijiga University
 Hawassa University
 Arba Minch University
 Debre Markos University
 University of Gondar
 Dire Dawa University
 Madda Walabu University
 Adama Science And Technology University
 Debre Birhan University
 Mizan–Tepi University
 Wolaita Sodo University

Private universities
 Unity University
 Rift Valley University College
 Ethiopian Civil Service University

Colleges
 Hamlin College of Midwifery 
 Harambe College
 Harar Agrotechnical University
 Ayer Tena Health Science College
 Blue Nile College
 Hawassa Health Science College

References

Higher education in Ethiopia
Education in Ethiopia